Petro Kotok (born 28 April 1965) is a Ukrainian wrestler. He competed in the men's Greco-Roman 130 kg at the 1996 Summer Olympics.

References

External links
 

1965 births
Living people
Ukrainian male sport wrestlers
Olympic wrestlers of Ukraine
Wrestlers at the 1996 Summer Olympics
Sportspeople from Rivne
20th-century Ukrainian people